The 1976–77 Arkansas Razorbacks men's basketball team represented the University of Arkansas in the 1976–77 college basketball season. The Razorbacks played their home games in Barnhill Arena in Fayetteville, Arkansas. It was Eddie Sutton's third season as head coach of the Hogs. The 1976–77 season was the second for Arkansas featuring "The Triplets," the famed trio of Ron Brewer, Marvin Delph, and Sidney Moncrief, who led the team and program into an eighteen-game winning streak and national relevance. The Razorbacks won the Southwest Conference regular season championship with a perfect conference record of 16–0, Arkansas's third and most recent perfect conference season, and an overall record of 26-2. The Razorbacks went on to win the 1977 SWC Conference tournament against , Arkansas's first conference tournament championship after being a semifinalist in the SWC's inaugural basketball tournament the season before. The 1976–77 season was the first of six times that the Hogs would capture both the regular season and tournament titles in the SWC. 

The Razorbacks clinched their bid to the NCAA tournament with their SWC Tournament victory, guaranteeing Arkansas's fifth appearance in the tournament overall and first since 1958.

Arkansas entered the AP Poll at #19 on December 13th, 1976, the first time the Hogs were ranked since 1958. The Razorbacks had only been ranked for a cumulative total of four weeks prior to this season, but would remain ranked for the rest of the season, including finishing ranked for the first time in school history, coming in at #19 after spending fourteen weeks in the polls and reaching a peak ranking of #6 on February 21, 1977.

Guard Ron Brewer was named a Helms All-American, as well as picking up First-Team All-SWC honors. Guard Sidney Moncrief garnered Honorable Mention All-American recognition from the AP and The Sporting News, while also being recognized as a First-Team All-SWC player. Forward Marvin Delph joined Brewer and Moncrief on the All-SWC First Team.

The team featured future Arkansas football head coach, Houston Dale Nutt Jr., a freshman guard from Little Rock Central High School.

Roster

Schedule and results
Schedule retrieved from HogStats.com.

|-
!colspan=12 style=| Exhibition

|-
!colspan=12 style=| Regular season

|-
!colspan=12 style=|  SWC tournament

|-
!colspan=12 style=|  NCAA tournament

References

Arkansas Razorbacks
Arkansas Razorbacks men's basketball seasons
Arkansas